The 13429 / 13430 Malda Town–Anand Vihar Terminal Weekly Express is the Express, as well as the like other normal Express trains. It is the newer one train.

The Malda Town–Anand Vihar Weekly Express left Malda Town railway station for Anand Vihar Terminal railway station, to cover a distance of   km in 29 hours 30 mins. It had an 1 AC 2 Tier, 2 AC 3-tier and 6 3-Tier Sleeper. It is hauled by Indian locomotive class WDM-3A..

History
It was inaugurated at Tuesday 9 January 2015. It's just completed 3 years (in this month) after inauguration.

Destinations
The train is an important link between Malda Town to New Delhi. It runs near some of the most holy sites in India.

Timing
 13429 Malda Town–Anand Vihar Terminal Weekly Express leaves Malda Town railway station on a one-day-in-a-week basis at 09:05 hrs IST and reaches Anand Vihar Terminal railway station at 14:35 hrs IST the 2nd day.
 13430 Anand Vihar Terminal–Malda Town Weekly Express leaves Anand Vihar Terminal railway station on one days in a weekly basis at 17:10 hrs IST and reaches Malda Town railway station at 23:50 hrs IST the 2nd day.

On this route, the train covers a distance of    in 29 hrs 30 mins.

Coach composition

Trivia

 Malda Town–Anand Vihar Weekly Express has One AC 2-Tier, Tow AC 3-Tier, Six 3-Tier Sleeper, Six General and two SLR.

See also

Express trains in India
List of named passenger trains of India

References

 http://indiarailinfo.com/trains/rajdhani
 Times of India article

Transport in Maldah
Transport in Delhi
Railway services introduced in 2015
Express trains in India
Rail transport in West Bengal
Rail transport in Uttar Pradesh
Rail transport in Jharkhand
Rail transport in Bihar
Rail transport in Delhi